The Detroit Statler Hotel (also known as the Detroit Hilton Hotel) was a building located at 1539 Washington Boulevard across from Grand Circus Park between the David Whitney Building and the Hotel Tuller in Downtown Detroit, Michigan. In addition to Washington Boulevard, the hotel also fronted Bagley Street and Park Avenue.

History
The Hotel Statler was designed for Statler Hotels by George B. Post and Louis Rorimer in the Georgian architectural style, with English Renaissance Revival roots evident. It consisted of 18 floors: sixteen above grade and two basement floors. Construction began on the original 800-room portion in 1914 and was completed in 1915.

Harry Houdini stayed at the hotel in October 1926, during his last engagement at the nearby Garrick Theater.

The Statler chain was purchased by Hilton Hotels in 1954. The Hotel Statler was renamed the Statler Hilton in 1958 and then later the Detroit Hilton. Hilton proceeded to remodel and modernize the hotel's interior during the 1960s. In 1974, Hilton ceased their management, and the structure was renamed the Detroit Heritage Hotel until it was abandoned in 1975.

After sitting vacant for 30 years, the structure was eventually demolished following approval by the Detroit Historic District Commission. Demolition of the building floor by floor began in August 2005 and was completed in time for the Super Bowl XL; the process took months due to the hotel's strong concrete structure. During the demolition process, a vacant four-story building once occupied by the Automobile Club of Michigan also known as the DAIIE (Detroit Automobile Club Inter-Insurance Exchange) building on a neighboring lot caught fire. The fire destroyed much of the structure's roof and upper floor. The cause of the blaze was determined to be hot metal material that had been dropped from the Statler Hotel onto the Automobile Club building's roof. The building's structure required the onsite treatment of 750,000 gallons of PCB-contaminated water following demolition.

Site redevelopment
On March 26, 2014, a 200-250 unit apartment building was announced to be built on the former site of the Statler Hotel. At the time of its proposal, this building would have been one of the first entirely newly constructed apartments in downtown Detroit since the early 1990s (excluding apartments built from converted offices).
In October 2017, the newly branded, seven story City Club Apartments CBD Detroit broke ground, developed by City Club Apartments LLC. Upon its completion in June of 2021, the building had 288 apartments and 13,000 square feet of retail space. Its tenants include Premier Pet Supply and the Statler Bistro, an homage to the former hotel.

Facts
 A lawsuit by preservationists temporarily delayed the city's plans to demolish the former hotel building.
 The hotel had proven so popular that a 200-room addition was added onto the back of the hotel along Washington Boulevard.
 According to the original blueprints, one of the penthouse roof levels lies at 226' above the street, and Sanborn Maps list the other at 232' above the street. The full structural height is unclear.
 The hotel was situated within six feet of the Detroit People Mover elevated railway.

References

Further reading

External links

Hotel Statler Detroit details at Emporis.com
SkyscraperPage.com's Profile on the Hotel Statler Detroit
Forgotten Detroit's Statler Hotel history and details
Article in Architectural Record (1915) with floor plans

Skyscraper hotels in Detroit
Downtown Detroit
Demolished hotels in the United States
Defunct hotels in the United States
Demolished buildings and structures in Detroit
Hotel buildings completed in 1915
Buildings and structures demolished in 2005
1915 establishments in Michigan
1975 disestablishments in Michigan
George B. Post buildings